West Kingsdown Windmill  is a Grade II listed smock mill in West Kingsdown, Kent, England, that was built in the early nineteenth century at Farningham and moved to West Kingsdown in 1880. It is the survivor of a pair of windmills.

History

Post mill

William Coles Finch stated that the post mill was originally built at Sevenoaks. However, the mill may have been built on site c.1804, when it was advertised for sale in the Kentish gazette of 25 September 1804.

In 1880, it was joined by the smock mill that was moved from Farningham and which survives today. The post mill was burnt down in May 1909 when a steam roller set fire to some straw near the mill and the fire then spread to the mill.

Smock mill
West Kingsdown Windmill was built in the early nineteenth century at Chimham's Farm, Farningham. It was marked on the 1819–20 Ordnance Survey map, Greenwoods map of 1821 and the Farningham Tithe Map of 1840. In 1880, it was moved to West Kingsdown, joining a post mill that was already there. The post mill burnt down in May 1909. The mill was working by wind until 1928. One of the sails was damaged on 25 December 1929 and the fantail blew off in November 1930. The mill was restored externally in 1960 by Thompson & Son, Millwrights of Alford, Lincolnshire at a cost of £4.400. In 2009, repairs to the weatherboards were made, and the mill was repainted. As of November 2010, it is awaiting the fitting of new sails.

Description

Post mill
Old Mill was a post mill on a single-storey roundhouse. It was winded by a tailpole. It had two Spring sails and two Common Sails carried on a cast-iron windshaft.

Smock Mill

West Kingsdown Mill is a four-storey smock mill on a single storey single-storey brick base. There was a stage at first-floor level. It has two double Patent sails and two Common sails carried on a cast-iron windshaft. The mill is winded by a fantail. The original fantail had seven blades, but this was replaced with a six-bladed one when the mill was restored in 1960. A seven-bladed fantail has since been fitted. All the machinery remains in the mill, except for the final drive to the millstones.

Millers

Post mill
Sevenoaks
William Knott 1792 - 1814
Charles Knott - 1864
William Eames 1864-

West Kingsdown
Tanner Norton 1880-

Smock mill
Farningham
Collyer 1826 - 1850
William Kipping 1840
W Moore
David Norton
Tanner Norton - 1880

West Kingsdown
Tanner Norton 1880 -
Frank Norton
Cork 1929
Hankin

References for above:-

References

External links
Windmill World page on the mill.

Windmills in Kent
Grinding mills in the United Kingdom
Post mills in the United Kingdom
Smock mills in England
Grade II listed buildings in Kent
Grade II listed windmills
Windmills completed in 1880
Octagonal buildings in the United Kingdom